Miudes is one of eight parishes (administrative divisions) in the El Franco municipality, within the province and autonomous community of Asturias, in northern Spain. 

The population is 535 (INE 2007).

Villages and hamlets
 Castello
 Godella
 Miudeira
 Miudes
 Veiral
 Villar

References  

Parishes in El Franco